Cogolludo is a municipality located in the province of Guadalajara, Castile-La Mancha, Spain.  It forms part of the comarca of La Serranía and was the manorial home of the Dukes of Medinaceli.  In 2015, it had a population of 600 inhabitants. The historic Church of Santa María stands in the town.

Name and symbols
Its original name was Cugullent, from the Latin cucullus, which means "cap." This alludes to its location on a hill and to the crowding of its houses that mimics the appearance of a pineapple or bud.  "Bud" would come to mean, according to other authors, "mound with a steep slope."

The municipal coat of arms - approved by decree on December 20, 1985 - is the following:

 Cut: 1st and 4th part, made of gules, golden tower masoned with sable and clarified with gules; silver match the rampant lion of gules; 2nd and 3rd, of azure, three golden lyses, 2-1. At the top, royal crown closed.
  -Official Gazette of Castilla-La Mancha No. 52 of December 31, 1985

The municipal flag is a cloth of 2:3 proportions of crimson red color with the municipal coat of arms in the center.

Notable people
 Tomás de la Cerda, 3rd Marquis of la Laguna, Grandee of Spain

References

Municipalities in the Province of Guadalajara